City of Kings may refer to:

 City of Kings (album) - an album by X-Raided
 Lima, Peru - founded as Ciudad de los Reyes